The videography of Eric Clapton consists of 22 video albums and concert films as well as 17 music videos. His commercially most successful video releases are the DVDs of his Crossroads Guitar Festival series. His 2007 release sold over two million DVD and Blu-rays to date, making it one of the best-selling music video DVDs ever to be released. The 2004 Crossroads Guitar Festival DVD was certified 10-times Platinum by the Recording Industry Association of America. Clapton's video releases are popular all over the world, especially in North and South Armerica, Europe and Oceania. Clapton's small number of music videos are similarly successful. Every music video Clapton has released, has been shown more than 30 weeks in succession on MTV, VH1, MuchMusic, MTV2 and Fuse TV – rarely has any other artist been broadcast that often on a music TV channel throughout their whole career.

Video albums and concert films

Music videos

Lead artist music videos

Collaboration efforts

See also
Eric Clapton albums discography
Eric Clapton singles discography

References

Discographies of British artists
Videographies of British artists
Eric Clapton